The 1989 Brisbane Broncos season was the second in the club's history. They competed in the NSWRL's 1989 Winfield Cup premiership and in their second year improved on their first, finishing the season in sixth position after losing their first ever play-off match against the Cronulla-Sutherland Sharks. The Broncos did however claim their first piece of silverware by winning the mid-week knock-out 1989 Panasonic Cup competition.

Broncos trio Allan Langer, Michael Hancock and Kerrod Walters were selected to make their international debuts for Australia in 1989.

Season summary 
Coach Wayne Bennett said a mid-season Kangaroo Tour to New Zealand in 1989 contributed to the Broncos failing to reach the finals. Brisbane contributed captain Wally Lewis, Tony Currie, Peter Jackson, Michael Hancock, Kerrod Walters and Sam Backo - more players than any other club - to the successful Australian team, losing all three of their matches while they were away.

Match results 

 * Game following a State of Origin match

Ladder

Awards

League 
nil

Club 
 Player of the year: Greg Dowling
 Rookie of the year: Michael Hancock
 Forward of the year: Greg Dowling
 Back of the year: Tony Currie
 Clubman of the year: Tony Currie

Scorers

References 

Brisbane Broncos seasons
Brisbane Broncos season